Nishime (written: 西銘) is a Japanese surname. Notable people with the surname include:

, Japanese politician
, Japanese politician
, Japanese model and actor

Japanese-language surnames